Heliothis xanthia is a species of moth of the family Noctuidae. It is found in South America, including and possibly limited to Argentina.

External links
 Image

Heliothis
Moths described in 1999